The Lehigh Valley Railroad, Delaware River Bridge is an abandoned railway bridge originally built by the Lehigh Valley Railroad over the Delaware River between Easton, Pennsylvania and Phillipsburg, New Jersey. It was constructed by the American Bridge Company in 1901 and 1902 on piers built in 1866.

See also
List of bridges documented by the Historic American Engineering Record in New Jersey
List of bridges documented by the Historic American Engineering Record in Pennsylvania
List of crossings of the Delaware River
Lehigh Line (Norfolk Southern)

References

External links

Bridges over the Delaware River
Historic American Engineering Record in New Jersey
Historic American Engineering Record in Pennsylvania
Railroad bridges in New Jersey
Railroad bridges in Pennsylvania
Bridges in Warren County, New Jersey
Bridges in Northampton County, Pennsylvania
Easton, Pennsylvania
Phillipsburg, New Jersey
Interstate railroad bridges in the United States
Lehigh Valley Railroad